Paule Joseph Marie Eugénie Charlotte Régnier (19 June 1888 in Fontainebleau (Seine-et-Marne) – 1 December 1950 in Meudon (Hauts-de-Seine) was a French writer, laureate of the Grand prix du roman de l'Académie française in 1934.

Biography 
Paule Regnier grew up in Versailles, where her father, a career officer, had been sent in 1890, and where he left his family when the obligations of the military profession caused him to change his residence. After the death of her father in 1902, her mother moved with her and her two older sisters to Paris. After the marriage of these, Paule Regnier remained alone with her mother until the death of the latter in 1926.

Works 

1913: Octave
1924: La Vivante Paix
1929: Heureuse Faute
1919: Marcelle, faible femme
1930: Le Roi Mage de Maillezais
1931: Petite et Nadie
1933: L'Abbaye d'Évolayne – Grand prix du roman de l'Académie française
1936: Cherchez la joie
1941: Tentation
1942: L'Expérience d'Alain
1945: Ce qui fait le bonheur
1946: L'Aventure d'Hermione Capulet
1947: La Face voilée, essay on pain, followed by Plaintes dans la nuit
1949: Les Filets de la mer
Posthumous publications
1953: Journal, foreword by 
1956: Fêtes et Nuages, chronique d'une enfance
1956: Lettres

References

External links 
 Paule Régnier on the site of the Académie française
 Paule Régnier on Éditions Gallimard
 Paule Régnier on Nuit Blanche

20th-century French non-fiction writers
20th-century French women writers
Grand Prix du roman de l'Académie française winners
People from Fontainebleau
Writers from Versailles
1888 births
1950 deaths
1950 suicides
Suicides in France